The 2022 League1 British Columbia season was the inaugural season of play for League1 British Columbia, a pro-am league in the Canadian soccer league system. The league is the highest level of soccer based in the Canadian province of British Columbia except for fully professional clubs in the Canadian Premier League and Major League Soccer. Seven clubs participated in the 2022 season in both the men's and women's divisions.

TSS FC Rovers defeated Varsity FC in the final to win the inaugural men's title and qualify for the 2023 Canadian Championship, while the Whitecaps FC Girls Elite Academy also defeated Varsity in the final to win the inaugural women's title. Varsity FC represented the league at the Women's Interprovincial Championship, finishing in fourth place. Varsity FC captured the Juan de Fuca Plate as the combined table leaders across the men's and women's divisions.

Format 
The regular season was contested by seven clubs and ran from May 22 to July 24, 2022. Each team played 12 games in a double round-robin format with six games at home and six on the road. The top-two teams advanced to the Championship Final, held on the BC Day long weekend. The men's and women's divisions used identical schedules with the two matches being played as double-headers on the same day.

Men's division 
The teams played each other team twice (home and away) for a 12 game season, with the top two teams facing each other in a championship final. The winner of the men's division qualified for the 2023 Canadian Championship.

League table

Championship final

Results table

Fixtures

May 22–28

May 29–June 4

June 5–11

June 12–18

June 19–25

June 26–July 2

July 3–July 9

July 10–July 17

July 19–July 24

Women's division 
The winner of the women's division qualified for the Interprovincial Championship.

League table

Championship final

Results table

Fixtures

May 22–28

May 29–June 4

June 5–11

June 12–18

June 19–25

June 26–July 2July 3–July 9July 10–July 17July 19–July 24'''

Juan de Fuca Plate
The Juan de Fuca Plate was historically awarded to the top British Columbia-based team in Premier Development League based on matches played between the BC clubs. With the creation of League1 British Columbia, it was decided that the trophy would be awarded to the League1 British Columbia club with the highest combined point total between the men's and women's divisions in regular season matches.

References

External links 

League1 BC
League1 British Columbia
BC